The deep parotid lymph nodes are lymph nodes found below the parotid gland.

The afferents of the subparotid glands drain the nasal part of the pharynx and the posterior parts of the nasal cavities.

Their efferents pass to the superior deep cervical glands.

Additional images

References

Lymphatics of the head and neck